The 2014 City of Lincoln Council election took place on 22 May 2014 to elect members of City of Lincoln Council in England. This was on the same day as other local elections. The Labour Party increased its majority on the council by gaining three seats, leaving them with 27 seats to the Conservatives 6.

Election results

All comparisons in vote share are to the corresponding 2010 election.

Ward results

Abbey

Birchwood

Boultham

Bracebridge

Carholme

Castle

Glebe

Hartsholme

Minster

Moorland

Park

References

2014 English local elections
2014
2010s in Lincolnshire